Anggisu Barbosa (born 16 March 1993) is a football player, currently playing as a forward for the Timor-Leste national football team. He is the second youngest player to make his debut with the Timor-Leste national football team at the age of 15 years and 217 days, with the youngest being Adelino Trindade, who made his debut at the age of 15 years and 172 days.

International career
Barbosa made his senior international debut in the 2008 AFF Championship qualification against Cambodia national football team on 19 October 2008 when he was aged 15 years 217 days, he also scored his first international goals in that match.

Career statistics

International appearances

International goals

Honours

Club
Atlético Ultramar
Taça 12 de Novembro : 2018

References

1993 births
Living people
People from Dili
East Timorese footballers
Association football forwards
Timor-Leste international footballers
F.C. Porto Taibesi players
Anggisu Barbosa
East Timorese expatriate footballers
East Timorese expatriate sportspeople in Thailand
Expatriate footballers in Thailand
Footballers at the 2014 Asian Games
Asian Games competitors for East Timor